Dorstenia conceptionis is a plant species in the family Moraceae which is native to eastern Brazil.

References

conceptionis
Plants described in 1974
Flora of Brazil